Mauritania competed at the 2019 African Games held from 19 to 31 August 2019 in Rabat, Morocco.

Athletics 

Abidine Abidine was the only athlete to represent Mauritania in athletics. He competed in the men's 5000 metres event and he finished in 27th place.

Chess 

Sidi Mohamed Cheikh Hassan and Yahi Mohamed Salem both competed in the men's blitz individual and the men's rapid individual events.

Judo 

One athlete represented Mauritania in judo.

Karate 

Vadel Haidara competed in karate. He was eliminated in the first round.

Shooting 

Levdhil Levdhil competed in the men's trap event. He did not win a medal.

Table tennis 

Moctar Ahmed Salem El competed in table tennis in the men's singles event. He was eliminated in his first match against Maret Camara (representing Guinea).

Tennis 

Said Mohamed El Hafedh competed in tennis in the men's singles event. He lost his match against Johnson Acquah (representing Ghana) and did not advance to the next match.

Wrestling 

Abou Diallo (Men's Greco-Roman 60 kg) and Bocar Mbodj (Men's Freestyle 74 kg) were scheduled to compete in wrestling but neither competed in their event.

References 

Nations at the 2019 African Games
2019
African Games